Raniera Te Ahiko (?–1894) was a notable New Zealand historian. Of Māori descent, he identified with the Ngai Te Upokoiri and Ngati Kahungunu iwi. He was born in Taumata-o-he Pa, Hawke's Bay, New Zealand.

References

1894 deaths
19th-century New Zealand historians
Ngāti Kahungunu people
Year of birth unknown